Summa St. Thomas Hospital is an orthopedic and psychiatric hospital located in Akron, Ohio.  The hospital opened in 1922 and was originally operated by the Sisters of Charity of St. Augustine as a non-denominational, non-profit general hospital.  In 1989, St. Thomas Hospital merged with Akron City Hospital to become Summa Health System.

History

On August 16, 1935, Sister Ignatia Gavin, a Catholic sister in charge of admissions at St. Thomas Hospital, with the help of Dr. Bob Smith, one of the founders of Alcoholics Anonymous, admitted the first alcoholic patient under the diagnosis of acute gastritis. This event made St. Thomas Hospital the first hospital in the world to treat alcoholism as a medical condition, and the first religious institution to recognize the rights of alcoholics to receive hospital treatment.

In 2010, Summa Akron City Hospital and St. Thomas Hospitals were awarded nursing's highest honor, Magnet recognition, by American Nurses Credentialing Center. Only six percent of hospitals in the United States are recognized as Magnet hospitals.

In 2014, St. Thomas hospital closed its emergency room and replaced it with a general practitioner, directing their emergency room patients to Akron City's recently opened 100 bed ER.

Summa Health is vacating the St. Thomas building and moving into the nearby Juve Family Behavioral Health Pavilion, which is expected to be completed in early 2023. Alcoholics Anonymous artifacts will be preserved and moved.

Recognition and honors
 Designated as a Magnet Hospital.
 Ranked No. 1 in the Akron metro area for cancer, diabetes and endocrinology, gastroenterology, geriatrics, gynecology, orthopaedics, pulmonology and urology.

References

External links
 

Hospitals in Ohio